Odendaal is a surname. Notable people with the surname include:

 André Odendaal (born 1954), South African historian and former first-class cricketer
 Burger Odendaal (born 1993), South African rugby union player
 Fox Odendaal (1898–1966), South African politician
 Hein Odendaal (born 1942), South African medical doctor
 Hendrik Odendaal (born 1979), South African swimmer
 Steven Odendaal (born 1993), South African motorcycle racer
 Welma Odendaal (born 1951), South African writer
 Willie Odendaal (born 1990), South African rugby union player